Hsawlaw is a town and seat of the Hsawlaw Township in the Kachin State in north-east Burma.

See also
 Tsawlaw, also in Hsawlaw Township

External links
Satellite map at Maplandia.com

Township capitals of Myanmar
Populated places in Kachin State
Hsawlaw Township